FlowTracer, previously known as Flowtracer/EDA, is a commercial build management tool developed by Runtime Design Automation. 

FlowTracer allows one to describe the basic flow of a software build in a Tcl-like language (Flow Description Language) or at execution time. The tool will then store and track the inputs and outputs of the flow in its database, automatically detecting changes as they occur. The tool provides a GUI to visualize, control and diagnose the workflow, for example with instant notification of failures.

FlowTracer is a commercial alternative to make and distcc.  It uses "makefiles" written in a proprietary format. It supports multiple platforms such as Linux, Mac OS X, Microsoft Windows and other Unix variants (AIX, HP-UX, Solaris).

References

External links 
 

make